Guy of Cyprus may refer to:

 Guy of Lusignan (1150–1194), King of Cyprus from 1192 to 1194. Son of Hugh VIII of Lusignan
 Guy of Ibelin, constable of Cyprus (1215–1255), husband of Philippa, daughter of Aimery Berlais. Son of John of Ibelin, the Old Lord of Beirut (1179–1236)
 Guy of Cyprus (died 1302), Constable of Cyprus, son of Hugh III, and second husband on December 7, 1291 of Eschive d'Ibelin (1253–1312). Father of Hugh IV of Cyprus

See also
 Officers of the Kingdom of Cyprus